Valhalla is a neighborhood within the city of Marathon in Monroe County, Florida, United States.  It is located in the middle Florida Keys on the island of Crawl Key.

Geography

References

Neighborhoods in Marathon, Florida